was a town located in Kanzaki District, Saga Prefecture, Japan. The status of this municipality was changed from a village to a town on April 1, 1965.

As of 2003, the town had an estimated population of 9,492 and a density of 874.84 persons per km2. The total area of the town was 10.85 km2.

On March 1, 2006, Mitagawa, along with the village of Higashisefuri (also from Kanzaki District), was merged to create the town of Yoshinogari.

Dissolved municipalities of Saga Prefecture